Kim Wol-ha (February 8, 1918 – January 1, 1996), real name Kim Duk-sun, was a South Korean singer, a master of gugak, an Ingan-munhwage of gagok, a master of sijo and gasa, distinguished performer and teacher.

Biography 
She was born on February 8, 1918, in Hanjin, Gyeonggi Province, Korea. At age 2 her grandmother, mother and two brothers died from cholera. Her father was shocked by the deaths and abandoned her. She lived with her aunt for two years, and was adopted by a woman named Ryu who lived in Sagan-dong, Jongno-gu, Seoul. At that time, her name was Yoo Jung-hwan. Her sister called her to home to Suwon as her father had returned. She married at 16. Her husband worked in Yangju country office. She went to evening high school affiliated with the Myodong Church in Seoul. Then the Korean War broke out and her husband was taken by the Communist military. She moved to Busan until the war end and made her living by sewing. She suffered from an ulcer and heard sijo while walking in the Busan dongdaesindong Gudeok catchment area. She practiced sijo alone, but she was so talented that has caught an eye of an expert sijo singer and was introduced to Kim Tae-young. She studied for three years in Busan, under Lee Byung-sung who studied in yiwangjik aakbu. She learned to sing and learned lyric of sijo. During that time, she changed her name to Wol-ha. In 1973, she becomes the holder of gagok, the Important Intangible Cultural Property No.30. Later, she established Wol-ha Cultural Foundation and gave scholarship to more than 100 deserving students.

Career 

 1955.7—Education at Leeds Dongnae
 1955.9—Kyungnam High School (vocal) instructor
 1955-1958—Busan Education Board (vocal) instructor
 1956—Busan Horticultural School (vocal) instructor
 1961-1967—President of South Korea Jung akwon, Education
 1968—Gukak Association of Korea Director and Chairman of this Subcommittee jeongak
 1970.1—Korea Association founder gukak subcommittee
 1971.11—Appointed vice-chairman of the Ministry of chungmuhoe
 1973.11—Important Intangible Cultural Property No. 30

Awards 

 1995—Special Achievement Award KBS gukak prize
 1994—Seoul's citizen prize
 1992—Bogwanjang Order of Culture
 1991—Culture Award three kinds
 1988—National Medal of mokryeonjang
 1984—Sejong prize
 1984—Gukak prize
 1958—President Syngman Rhee Memorial songbirds Sun Yet Sin Contest

References 
Korean Cultural Heritage Administration
Korean Culture Information Service

1918 births
1996 deaths
People from Gyeonggi Province
South Korean musicians